The Graphic Arts Building in downtown Kansas City, Missouri, USA, is an eight-story, 58 unit, reinforced concrete building. Following an approval in 2005 for redevelopment, it currently houses the Graphic Arts Lofts (formerly Park University).

The building was built in 1915 as a headquarters for commercial printing and related trades.

The building's architect, Samuel B. Tarbet, also built other local commercial buildings such as the Wheeling Corrugating Company
Building, the Goodenow Textiles Company Building, Kansas City Athenaeum, J. D. Bowerstock Theater (now known as Liberty Hall) and Olathe City Hall. Additionally, he built residences for H. F. Hill, C.F. Myers and Dr. Guffey.

The first floor houses the leasing office for Old Town Lofts buildings.

In 2005, it was added to the National Register of Historic Places.

References

External links
Kansas City Public Library Resources on buildings surrounding, and including, Graphic Arts Building
Hoffman Cortes Contracting Company

Buildings and structures in Kansas City, Missouri
Commercial buildings completed in 1915
Commercial buildings on the National Register of Historic Places in Missouri
Residential buildings on the National Register of Historic Places in Missouri
National Register of Historic Places in Kansas City, Missouri
Library District (Kansas City, Missouri)